Geovanni Deiberson Maurício Gómez (born 11 January 1980), known simply as Geovanni, is a Brazilian former professional footballer. He was mostly used as an attacking midfielder but was also able to play on both wings and up front.

Club career

Early career
When Geovanni emerged from the youth set-up at Cruzeiro most Brazilian critics were intrigued by his talents and believed he could become a great player at the highest level. When Geovanni was 18 he enjoyed a successful loan spell at America, scoring one goal in 15 games at the right wing position. He instantly commanded a first team place at the Brazilian team. Once his loan spell had finished he immediately found his way into the first team of Cruzeiro and was a fan favourite at the Belo Horizonte club.

Barcelona
Geovanni was purchased by Barcelona for $18 million in summer 2001, signing a four-year deal, despite reported interest from Arsenal and Juventus. Geovanni scored his first goal for Barcelona against Real Zaragoza. Geovanni made 21 La Liga appearances scoring 1 goal, mostly as a substitute. In his second season, he fell out with coach Carles Rexach and was not featured in Barcelona's starting 11 for the majority of the season and only played 5 league matches. Geovanni was then loaned out to Portuguese club Benfica the following season.

Benfica
In 2003 Geovanni agreed on terms with Benfica and was signed on a free transfer, agreeing to a four-year deal, after an impressive spell with Benfica on loan from Barcelona. He scored his first goal for Benfica against Braga scoring a free kick. He was a mainstay in the Benfica starting line-up and was hugely involved in winning 3 trophies for Benfica, the Portuguese Cup, Portuguese League and Portuguese Super Cup. Moreover, he was named "Benfica Player of the Year" in 2004 and 2005.

Some of Geovanni's memorable goals include a late winning free-kick against Sporting CP in the Lisbon derby at Estádio José Alvalade on 2 May 2004, helping giving Benfica access to the 2004–05 UEFA Champions League, as well as a diving header in the 2005–06 UEFA Champions League against Manchester United at the Estádio da Luz on 7 December 2005.

Despite having a successful spell at Benfica, Geovanni cancelled his contract after having family troubles and returned to Brazil.

Return to Brazil
In 2006 Geovanni rejoined Cruzeiro, signing a three-year deal. He was greeted at the airport by over 1,000 fans. Geovanni made his début scoring twice against Botafogo.

Manchester City
In July 2007, after being turned down by Portsmouth following a trial, he decided to join Manchester City on a one-year deal on 17 July 2007. On 11 August, Geovanni scored on his début for City in a 2–0 victory over West Ham United. The following week, he started and scored the only goal in City's 1–0 win over local rivals Manchester United to continue Manchester City's 100% start to the season. Geovanni also scored against Wigan Athletic on 1 December 2007. On 3 July 2008, he was released by Manchester City.

Hull City
On 5 July 2008 it was announced that Geovanni would be joining Hull City on a two-year contract. He scored Hull's first ever Premier League goal on his début against Fulham on 16 August and was voted Man of the Match.

On 27 September he scored his second Premier League goal for City with a 25-yard equalizer against Arsenal. Hull would go on to score again and record their first ever away win over Arsenal, defeating the London club 2–1. The following weekend, Geovanni scored a 30-yard free kick in a 1–0 victory against Tottenham Hotspur at White Hart Lane. His form for Hull earned high praise from Hull chairman Paul Duffen and Luis Felipe Scolari.

Geovanni went on to score goals against West Bromwich Albion, a penalty kick against Manchester United in a seven-goal thriller, and during a 2–2 home draw against former club Manchester City on 16 November.

He finished the season as Hull's top goalscorer as they narrowly avoided relegation. He signed a new two-year contract with Hull in September 2009, which would expire in June 2011.

Geovanni started well in the 2009–10 season for Hull City scoring four goals in just seven games, including strikes against Southend United in the League Cup, and league goals against Wolverhampton Wanderers, Liverpool, and Wigan Athletic. On 31 October 2009, Geovanni was sent off against Burnley after receiving two bookings. At the end of the season following Hull's relegation, he agreed to cancel his contract.

San Jose Earthquakes
On 16 August 2010, Geovanni agreed to terms with the San Jose Earthquakes of Major League Soccer, becoming the club's first designated player. On 20 August 2010, it was announced that Geovanni will wear the number 77 shirt and make his debut against the Los Angeles Galaxy on 21 August 2010 in the California Clasico. On 5 September 2010, Geovanni made his first start for the Earthquakes and notched a goal and an assist in a 2–1 away win against the Houston Dynamo. Geovanni's option on his contract was not picked up by the club at the end of the 2010 season.

Vitória
On 30 January 2011, Geovanni was announced as the new player of Vitória. On 27 February, he scored twice in a 2–0 win against Bahia de Feira. Two weeks later, he netted a goal and delivered an assist in a 4–2 win against Juazeiro.

International career
Geovanni's first and only international appearance for Brazil's was in a 1–0 defeat to Mexico in the 2001 Copa América. Geovanni has also represented Brazil in the 2000 Olympic football tournament.

Career statistics

Club
As of 14 May 2010

1Including 3 matches in 2007–08 Football League Cup
2Including 1 match and 1 goal in 2009–10 Football League Cup

International

Honours

Club
Cruzeiro
Copa do Brasil: 2000
Recopa Sudamericana: 1998

Benfica
Primeira Liga: 2004–05
Taça de Portugal: 2003–04
Supertaça Cândido de Oliveira: 2005

International
Brazil U17
South American Under-17 Football Championship: 1997
FIFA U-17 World Championship: 1997

Brazil U23
CONMEBOL Men Pre-Olympic Tournament: 1999

References

External links

 
 Geovanni at Futpédia
 
 
 

1980 births
Living people
Sportspeople from Minas Gerais
Association football midfielders
Brazilian footballers
Olympic footballers of Brazil
Brazil international footballers
Brazilian expatriate footballers
Brazilian expatriate sportspeople in Spain
Expatriate footballers in Spain
Brazilian expatriate sportspeople in Portugal
Expatriate footballers in Portugal
Expatriate footballers in England
Brazilian expatriate sportspeople in the United States
América Futebol Clube (MG) players
Cruzeiro Esporte Clube players
S.L. Benfica footballers
FC Barcelona players
Manchester City F.C. players
Hull City A.F.C. players
San Jose Earthquakes players
Esporte Clube Vitória players
Clube Atlético Bragantino players
Campeonato Brasileiro Série A players
La Liga players
Primeira Liga players
Premier League players
Footballers at the 2000 Summer Olympics
Major League Soccer players
Designated Players (MLS)